Nathan Dean Joshua Wood-Gordon (born 31 May 2002), known professionally as Nathan Wood, is an English professional footballer who plays as a centre-back for EFL Championship club Swansea City.

Early life
Wood is the son of former Crystal Palace and Middlesbrough player Dean Gordon. He came from an athletic background, having taken part in various sporting competitions throughout 2014 and 2015. Prior to joining the Middlesbrough academy squad in 2015, he played for TIBS and Stockton Town.

He attended Conyers School in Yarm, this led to him featuring in the twelfth episode in the first series of the CBBC educational documentary series Our School in 2014, during this time he was in year 7, his first year in secondary school.

Club career

Middlesbrough
On 1 July 2018, Wood signed professional terms with Middlesbrough. He would become the club's youngest ever player to make a professional appearance, at 16 years and 72 days, replacing Daniel Ayala in an EFL Cup tie against Notts County on 14 August 2018.

On 1 February 2021, Wood joined League One side Crewe Alexandra on loan for the remainder of the 2020-21 season. He made his Crewe debut in a 2-1 defeat at Swindon Town on 20 February 2021.

On 31 August 2021, Wood moved north of the border to join Scottish Premiership club Hibernian on a season-long loan deal.
On 16 October 2021, Wood made his debut for Hibernian, where he played the full game in a 3–0 loss against Dundee United.
On 25 November 2021, it was announced that Wood had returned to parent club Middlesbrough for the remainder of his loan spell until January 2022, having only featured once for Hibernian.

Swansea City
On 10 June 2022, Wood joined Swansea City on a two-year contract for an undisclosed fee. Wood's new manager Russell Martin was a long-term admirer and had previously tried to sign the defender when in charge of Milton Keynes Dons.

International career
Wood has represented England at U15, U16, U17 and U18 level.

On 6 September 2021, Wood made his debut for the England U20s during a 6-1 victory over Romania U20s at St. George's Park.

Style of play
Wood is known to be a pacey player and has previously played as a left-midfielder as a result of this. He recorded a 100m time of 13.07 seconds when he was aged 13.

Career statistics

References

External links
 

2002 births
Living people
Footballers from Middlesbrough
English footballers
Association football central defenders
England youth international footballers
Middlesbrough F.C. players
Crewe Alexandra F.C. players
Hibernian F.C. players
Swansea City A.F.C. players
English Football League players
Scottish Professional Football League players